Trigonopterus angulicollis is a species of flightless weevil in the genus Trigonopterus from Indonesia.

Etymology
The specific name is derived from Latin angularis, meaning "angular", and collum, meaning "neck", or "pronotum".

Description
The holotype measured 2.58mm.  The body shape is slightly hexagonal.  General coloration is black with rust-colored legs and head.

Range

References

angulicollis
Beetles described in 2014
Beetles of Asia